The Daewoo Prince is a mid-size luxury car that was produced by Daewoo in South Korea between 1991 and 1997. The car was based on the rear-wheel drive Opel Rekord E, although the body was of Daewoo design, as opposed to the Opel-designed, Holden-manufactured body of the Prince's Royale predecessor. The Prince was powered by 1.8- and 2.0-litre Opel Family II four-cylinder engines. The Prince spawned two additional variants, the Daewoo Brougham and the Daewoo Super Salon, all three replaced by the Daewoo Chairman in 1997.

Gallery

Technical data

References

External links

Prince
Luxury vehicles
Mid-size cars
Cars introduced in 1991